Tetramethyltetrahydrofuran may refer to:

 2,2,5,5-Tetramethyltetrahydrofuran
 3,3,4,4-Tetramethyltetrahydrofuran